IFM may refer to:

Organisations
 IFM Therapeutics, a US-based pharmaceutical company
 Institute of Fisheries Management, a UK non-profit organisation
  (Malaysian: 'Malaysian Physics Institute'), a Malaysian professional body
 Institute for Media and Communication Policy, a German research institution
 Intergalactic FM, an online radio station based in the Netherlands
  (French: 'French Institute of Fashion'), a French higher-education institution
 iFM is a station of Radio Mindanao Network.

Science and technology
 Immunofluorescence microscopy, a technique used for light microscopy
 Incremental funding methodology, an approach to software development
 Forest fire weather index, a risk estimate
 Interaction-free measurement, in quantum mechanics

Other
 Independent forest monitoring, in forest law enforcement
 International Formula Master, a form of Motor Racing
 IFM Investors, an Australian investment management company

See also
 International Falcon Movement – Socialist Educational International, a federation of international progressive youth education organisations